Água Boa (Good Water) is a town of the Brazilian State of Mato Grosso.

In August 2007 an important Italian wind orchestra has performed there: the Orchestra Fiati Giovanile Italiana e Coro "I Music Piemonteis" conducted by Ugo Bairo, and his choir, conducted by Carmelo Luca Sambataro. There he premiered his wind composition dedicated to the local government: The Mato Grosso March.

It is served by Água Boa Airport.

References

Municipalities in Mato Grosso